ghaem abad (also Romanized as Charūbūnī; also known as Chardbūnī) is a village in Bondar Rural District, Senderk District, Minab County, Hormozgan Province, Iran. At the 2006 census, its population was 118, in 30 families.

References 

Populated places in Minab County